Flamschen (also Flamske) is a farming community in Coesfeld (Koesfeld), in Münsterland, Westphalia, Germany.

Flamschen is noted as the birthplace of Anne Catherine Emmerich.

References

Coesfeld